A deaerating feed tank (DFT), often found in steam plants that propel ships, is located after the main condensate pump and before the main feed booster pump. It has these three purposes:

 Remove dissolved oxygen (“air”) from the condensate
 Pre-heat the feedwater
 Provide a storage/surge volume

Based on the relevant theoretical Rankine cycle diagram, there are four main processes, or steps:
 1 to 2 Water pressure is raised from low to high (pump work in) (feedwater pump)
 2 to 3 Water is heated to boiling                             (heat input) (steam generator)
 3 to 4 Steam is expanded in the turbine                         (work out) (turbine)
 4 to 1 Wet vapor is condensed                                 (condensing) (surface condenser)

In the practical implementation of a Rankine cycle, it is common to break the single pump (process 1 to 2) into three pumps: (in water flow order:  condensate pump, feed booster pump and then feedwater pump).

Details 
 Dissolved oxygen is removed by injecting auxiliary exhaust steam into the upper portion of the tank (above the feed water level) at roughly the same location (elevation) that the condensate enters the tank.  The two are put in close physical contact over a large surface area to maximize heat transfer.  As the condensate is heated, the steam drives off any dissolved gasses.  Since the steam is injected above the feed water level a steam blanket forms above the water to keep the non-condensable gasses from re-entering the feed water.  There is a connection to the gland exhaust system on the upper portion of the DFT that withdraws the oxygen and other non-condensable gasses as they are driven from the condensate.  Removing oxygen minimizes corrosion and improves the vacuum quality.
 The steam heats the water in the tank
 The water in the tank serves as a surge volume within the steam plant.

A surge volume allows the plant to change bells (power output level) without running the feed pump dry or flooding the turbines.  Consider the plant running in a steady state condition.

The bell is increased, more power output demanded, the rate of feed is increased.  This draws more water from the condenser, perhaps to the point of being dry and starving the boiler resulting in a loss of propulsion.  This is until the water, converted to steam, provides its energy to the turbine and then is condensed in the condenser.

The bell is decreased, less power output demanded, the rate of feed is decreased.  Since less water is drawn from the condenser the condensate level rises, covering more condenser tubes, reducing the ability of the condenser to maintain vacuum and, if the level is allowed to go high enough, vacuum could be lost and/or water could impinge (and damage) the turbine blades as the turbine normally sits directly above the condenser.

Marine steam propulsion
Steam power